Courtney Allen Curtis was an American politician who served in the Missouri House of Representatives from 2013 to 2019. He represented the 73rd District, which includes such north St. Louis County municipalities as Ferguson, Berkeley, Kinloch, Woodson Terrace, St. Ann, Cool Valley, Hazelwood, Normandy, Bridgeton, and Edmundson.

A native of Ferguson, Missouri, Curtis was a vocal figure during the unrest over the shooting of Michael Brown.

In 2018 he was sentenced to 21 months in prison for using campaign funds for personal use.

Early life and career

Early life and education
Curtis was born on April 12, 1981, and raised in Florissant, Missouri, graduating from McCluer Senior High School in 1999. He attended Columbia College and University of Missouri, where he served as president of the Collegiate 100, a chapter of the 100 Black Men.

Career
A member of the Missouri Democratic Party, Curtis represents north St. Louis County (District 73) in the Missouri House of Representatives. He was elected to his first two-year term in  2012 and re-elected in 2014 and 2016. Curtis was appointed president of the Freshman Democratic Caucus and chair of the Freshman Bipartisan Issues committee. He was named Associated Students of the University of Missouri Legislator of the Year in 2013.

In April 2014, Curtis established North County Forever, a nonprofit organization dedicated to revitalization of the 73rd District.

In March 2016, Curtis introduced a controversial bill that would have designated the St. Louis Cardinals as the official Major League Baseball club of the state of Missouri.

A vocal advocate for greater inclusion of minorities in Missouri construction contracts, Curtis was involved in a physical altercation with fellow Democratic state representative Michael Butler of St. Louis after a heated exchange of words over Curtis's anti-union stance.

In 2017, he pled guilty to three counts of wire fraud regarding his unreported use of funds from his re-election campaign funds for which he used instead for personal expenses such as travel. He was fined over $77,000, but he did not pay them.  He then resigned. (2018)

Ferguson unrest
In the wake of the events surrounding the death of Michael Brown, Curtis called for the mayor, judges, and police leadership of Ferguson to step down.

Elections

2012
Curtis defeated Doug Clemens in the 2012 Democratic primary election and ran unopposed in the general election.

2014
Curtis ran unopposed in the 2014 primary and general elections.

2016
Curtis defeated Democratic challengers Daniel Wibracht, Eileen McGeoghegan, and Lee Smith in the 2016 primary election and ran unopposed in the general election.

Committee assignments
As an incoming freshman, Curtis served on the following committees:

2013–2014
Democrat Freshman Committee (president)
Freshman Bipartisan Issue Committee
Ways and Means Committee
Agri-Business Committee
International Trade Committee

2015–2017
Curtis was appointed chairman of the Special Committee on Urban Issues, becoming the only Democrat to chair a committee for 2015 legislative session. He also served on the following committees:
Joint Committee on Education
Rules Committee
Legislative Oversight Committee
Appropriations Committee
Health, Mental Health, and Social Services Committee
Ways and Means Committee
Government Oversight and Accountability Committee
Select Committee on Local, State, Federal Relations and Miscellaneous Business

2014 Bills

2014 Sponsored Bills

2014 Co-Sponsored Bills

2015 Sponsored Bills

2016 Sponsored Bills

2017 Sponsored Bills

*= Co-Sponsored Bills

References

http://ballotpedia.org/Courtney_Curtis
http://www.huffingtonpost.com/2014/01/31/courtney-allen-curtis_n_4704200.html
http://news.stlpublicradio.org/post/democrats-big-tent-open-right-work-legislation

1981 births
21st-century American politicians
African-American state legislators in Missouri
Living people
Democratic Party members of the Missouri House of Representatives
People from St. Louis County, Missouri
University of Missouri alumni
21st-century African-American politicians
20th-century African-American people
Missouri politicians convicted of crimes